Cyclin-dependent kinase 4 also known as cell division protein kinase 4 is an enzyme that in humans is encoded by the CDK4 gene. CDK4 is a member of the cyclin-dependent kinase family.

Function 

The protein encoded by this gene is a member of the Ser/Thr protein kinase family. This protein is highly similar to the gene products of S. cerevisiae cdc28 and S. pombe cdc2. It is a catalytic subunit of the protein kinase complex that is important for cell cycle G1 phase progression. The activity of this kinase is restricted to the G1-S phase, which is controlled by the regulatory subunits D-type cyclins and CDK inhibitor p16INK4a. This kinase was shown to be responsible for the phosphorylation of retinoblastoma gene product (Rb). Ser/Thr-kinase component of cyclin D-CDK4 (DC) complexes that phosphorylate and inhibit members of the retinoblastoma (RB) protein family including RB1 and regulate the cell-cycle during G1/S transition. Phosphorylation of RB1 allows dissociation of the transcription factor E2F from the RB/E2F complexes and the subsequent transcription of E2F target genes which are responsible for the progression through the G1 phase. Hypophosphorylates RB1 in early G1 phase. Cyclin D-CDK4 complexes are major integrators of various mitogenic and antimitogenic signals. Also phosphorylates SMAD3 in a cell-cycle-dependent manner and represses its transcriptional activity. Component of the ternary complex, cyclin D/CDK4/CDKN1B, required for nuclear translocation and activity of the cyclin D-CDK4 complex.

Clinical significance 

Mutations in this gene as well as in its related proteins including D-type cyclins, p16(INK4a), CDKN2A and Rb were all found to be associated with tumorigenesis of a variety of cancers.  One specific point mutation of CDK4 (R24C) was first identified in melanoma patients. This mutation was introduced also in animal models and its role as a cancer driver oncogene was studied thoroughly. Nowadays, deregulated CDK4 is considered to be a potential therapeutic target in some cancer types and various CDK4 inhibitors are being tested for cancer treatment in clinical trials.

Multiple polyadenylation sites of this gene have been reported.

It is regulated by Cyclin D.

Inhibitors
Ribociclib are US FDA approved CDK4 and CDK6 inhibitors for the treatment of estrogen receptor positive/ HER2 negative advanced breast cancer.

See also CDK inhibitor for inhibitors of various CDKs.

Interactions
Cyclin-dependent kinase 4 has been shown to interact with:

 CDC37, 
 CDKN1B,
 CDKN2B, 
 CDKN2C, 
 CEBPA, 
 CCND1, 
 CCND3, 
 DBNL, 
 MyoD, 
 P16, 
 PCNA,  and
 SERTAD1.

References

Further reading

External links
 
 
 

Cell cycle regulators
Protein kinases
EC 2.7.11
Oncogenes